The 1992–1993 Vendée Globe is a non-stop solo Round the World Yacht Race for IMOCA 50 and IMOCA 60 class yachts this is the second edition of the race starting on the 22nd November 1992 from Les Sables-d'Olonne.

Summary
The second race attracted a great deal of media coverage. American Mike Plant, one of the entrants in the first Vendée race, was lost at sea on the way to the race, his boat found capsized near the Azores.

The race set off into extremely bad weather in the Bay of Biscay, and several racers returned to the start to make repairs before setting off again (the only stopover allowed by the rules). Four days after the start, British sailor Nigel Burgess was found drowned off Cape Finisterre, having presumably fallen overboard. Alain Gautier and Bertrand de Broc led the race down the Atlantic; however, keel problems forced de Broc to abandon in New Zealand. Gautier continued with Philippe Poupon close behind, but a dismasting close to the finish held Poupon back, allowing Jean-Luc Van Den Heede to take second place. Nándor Fa became the first non French national to finish the race.

Results

Competitors

Participants Gallery

Participant Facts Equipment
Fifteen skippers started the race.

References

External links
 
 Official You Tube Channel
 

Vendée Globe
Vendée Globe
Vendée Globe
Vendée Globe
Vendée Globe